Vlada Anatolyevna Chernyavskaya (born 10 June 1966) is a Belarusian badminton player. She competed in women's singles and mixed doubles at the 1996 Summer Olympics in Atlanta.

References

External links

1966 births
Living people
Belarusian female badminton players
Olympic badminton players of Belarus
Badminton players at the 1996 Summer Olympics